Lieutenant Colonel Sir George Arnold Ford Kennard, 3rd Baronet (27 April 1915 – 13 December 1999) was an English soldier and author. He served in the 4th Queen's Own Hussars. His autobiography, Loopy, was published in 1990.

Life
He was a younger son of Sir Coleridge Arthur Fitzroy Kennard, 1st Baronet, and educated at Eton College. The title eventually passed to Sir George upon the death of his childless brother, Sir Lawrence.

A member of the 4th Hussars, Kennard was captured during World War II in Germany, where he was a prisoner of war until the United States Army liberated him.

Family
Kennard was married four times:

Firstly, in 1940, to Cecilia Violet Maunsell, only daughter of Cecil John Cokayne Maunsell, and Wilhelmine Violet Eileen FitzClarence (daughter of the 2nd Earl of Munster); they had one daughter, and the marriage was dissolved in 1958.
Secondly, in 1958, to Mollie Jessie Rudd Miskin, daughter of Hugh Wyllie.
His third wife was Nichola Carew.
His fourth wife and widow is Georgina Phillips.

The baronetcy became extinct upon his death.

References

1915 births
1999 deaths
Baronets in the Baronetage of the United Kingdom
British Army personnel of World War II
British World War II prisoners of war
4th Queen's Own Hussars soldiers
Wernher family